Cuneo is a city and comune in Piedmont, Italy, the capital of the province of Cuneo, the fourth largest of Italy’s provinces by area.

It is located at 550 metres (1,804 ft) in the south-west of Piedmont, at the confluence of the rivers Stura and Gesso.

Cuneo is bounded by the municipalities of Beinette, Borgo San Dalmazzo, Boves, Busca, Caraglio, Castelletto Stura, Centallo, Cervasca, Morozzo, Peveragno, Tarantasca and Vignolo.

It is located near six mountain passes:
Colle della Maddalena at 
Colle del Melogno at  
Colle San Bernardo at  
Colle di Nava at 

History

Cuneo was founded in 1198 by the local population, who declared it an independent commune, freeing themselves from the authority of the bishops of Asti and the marquisses of Montferrat and Saluzzo. In 1210, the latter occupied it, and in 1231 the Cuneesi rebelled. In 1238, they were recognized as a free commune by Emperor Frederick II.

In 1259, the independence of Cuneo ceased forever, as it gave itself, also to take protection against its more powerful neighbours, to Charles I of Anjou, who was then King of Naples and Count of Provence. Together with Alba, it was the main Angevine possession in Northern Italy; Angevine rule interrupted by periods under the control of Saluzzo, Savoy, and the Visconti of Milan was ended in 1382 when Cuneo was acquired by the Duchy of Savoy.

Cuneo became an important stronghold of the expanding Savoy state. The city was thus besieged several times by France: first in 1515 by Swiss troops of Francis I of France, then again in 1542, 1557, 1639, 1641, 1691 and, during the War of the Austrian Succession, in 1741. Cuneo resisted each siege successfully. The city was taken by France only during the Napoleonic Wars and was made the capital of the Stura department. After the restoration of the Kingdom of Sardinia, and the unification of Italy, Cuneo became the capital of its namesake province in 1859.

During World War II, from 1943 to 1945, it was one of the main centres of partisan resistance against the German occupation of Italy.
In 1943, Cuneo's Jewish citizens were briefly arrested and imprisoned at the nearby Borgo San Dalmazzo concentration camp by the order of Minister of the Interior Guido Buffarini Guidi. They were freed before the Minister's orders came into effect and most community members fled Cuneo into hiding. 

However, on 9 December 1944, the Cuneo Police Department reopened the camp and imprisoned the remaining Jewish residents of Cuneo most of whom were then deported to Auschwitz. Few survived according to reports. Italian partisans liberated Cuneo from the German and Italian fascist occupation on 25 April 1945. The retreating fascist forces murdered the remaining six Jewish prisoners being held at Cuneo's local prison.

Government

Main sights
 
Villa Oldofredi Tadini, built in the 14th and 15th centuries as a watchtower. It is now a museum housing collections of the owners, the Mocchia and Oldofredi Tadini families.
Villa Tornaforte, surrounded by an English-style park.
Civic Museum
Railway Museum
Churches of Santa Croce, San Giovanni Decollato and Santissima Annunziata, housing paintings by Giovan Francesco Gaggini.
Panoramic funicular that connects plateau to Gesso river.
Monument of Stura and Gesso in Torino Square
The median way of the plateau (Rome Avenue, Galimberti Square and Nice Avenue): the commercial heart of Cuneo.
New Bridge (Ponte Nuovo) between the center of the city and Madonna dell' Olmo 
Monument at Peano's curve
Palazzo Uffici Finanziari (PUF), highest edifice in the city at about 
Parri’s Park, a big green park under construction in the suburbs of the city.

Subdivisions
Most important and populated: Centro storico, Cuneo centro, Cuneo nuova, San Paolo, Donatello, Gramsci, San Rocco, Cerialdo, Confreria and Borgo San Giuseppe.

Climate
Cuneo has a temperate sub-continental climate, with cold winters and hot, dry summers. The coldest, January, averages . The rainfall pattern is similar to that of Turin, with two maxima—one primary and one secondary (spring and autumn) and two minima (summer and winter). The driest month is July, . Snowfalls are frequent owing to high elevation and wind patterns.

Cuisine and food
Cuneo's specialty is Cuneesi al rhum, small meringues with dark chocolate coating and a rum-based chocolate filling. They are a creation of Andrea Arione (1923), who also registered the name, and sold them in the bar still located in the central square, Piazza Galimberti; another claim makes them a creation of pastry chef Pietro Galletti from Dronero. Another specialty is "raviolini al plin", a small ravioli pasta made with meat and vegetables. The most famous brand there is Pastificio Boetti, also located close to the central square.

Sport

Volleyball
There is an important volleyball club, Piemonte Volley who won 1 Italian Volleyball League, 3 CEV Cup, 2 CEV SuperCup, 4 Italian Volleyball Cup and 3 Italian Volleyball SuperCup.

Football
Associazione Calcio Cuneo 1905 (A.C. Cuneo 1905) who plays in the 3rd level of Italian football.

Cycling
Many times stage of Giro d'Italia. In 2016, for the first time in the Giro history, the race arrived in Sant'Anna di Vinadio sanctuary, the highest sanctuary in Europe, 2035 m, and the day after, on May 29, the race started from Cuneo. 
Since 1987 Cuneo has been the start and arrival point of the amateur international race "La Fausto Coppi".

See also
 Venchi
 Ferrero SpA
 Cemetery

Notable people

Annibale Santorre di Rossi de Pomarolo, Count of Santarosa (1783–1825), early Risorgimento leader.
Franco Andrea Bonelli (1784–1830), ornithologist, entomologist and collector.
Giuseppe Peano (1858–1932), mathematician.
Giovanni Battista Ceirano (1860) – automobile pioneer, joint founder of Ceirano, Well-Eyes bicycles, Well-Eyes cars – the first F.I.A.T., SCAT (Società Ceirano Automobili Torino)
Matteo Ceirano 1870 – automobile pioneer, joint founder of Itala Fabrica Automobile and S.P.A. (Società Piemontese Automobili) 
Ernesto Ceirano 1875 – Winner of 1911 and 1914 Targa Florio in SCAT automobiles.
Giorgio Federico Ghedini (1892–1965), composer.
Tancredi "Duccio" Galimberti (1906–1944), anti-fascist lawyer
Nuto Revelli (1919–2004), partisan and writer.
Cesare Damiano (born 1948), politician.
Carlo Petrini (born 22 June 1949), born in the province of Cuneo in the commune of Bra in Italy, is the founder of the International Slow Food Movement.  In 2004, he founded the University of Gastronomic Sciences, a school intended to bridge the gap between agriculture and gastronomy.
Piergiorgio Odifreddi (born 1950), mathematician, logician and aficionado of the history of science.
Alviero Martini (born 1950), fashion designer.
Celestino Migliore (born 1952), Papal diplomat.
Livia Turco (born 1955), politician.
Michele Ferrero (1925–2015), patriarch of Italian chocolate dynasty Ferrero Group. He inherited the company from his father Pietro in the 1950s and turned it into one of the world's largest confectionery makers, whose brands include Ferrero Rocher hazelnut chocolates, Nutella and Tic Tac.

Twin towns – sister cities
Cuneo is twinned with:
 Santa Fe, Argentina
 Nice, France
 Richard Toll, Senegal
 Fürstenberg/Havel, Germany

References

External links

 Cuneo homepage, comune.cuneo.it 
 Parco Fluviale Gesso e Stura, www.parcofluvialegessostura.it 

 
Cities and towns in Piedmont